Most Recently Used (MRU) may refer to:

 A specific menu in Microsoft Windows, see Common menus in Microsoft Windows
 An uncommon method of caching disk access, see Cache algorithms